Vincent Boury (born 21 June 1969 in Colmar) is a French table tennis player.

He represented France at the 2008 Summer Paralympics, in class 2, and beat fellow French competitor Stéphane Molliens to win gold.

He had previously won a silver medal at the 1996 Summer Paralympics, and a bronze at the 2000 Games. He has also been vice-world champion in 1998, 2002 and 2006, and won the team event at the 2002 World Cup.

Boury works as a security engineer.

References

External links 
 
 

1969 births
Living people
French male table tennis players
Paralympic table tennis players of France
Paralympic gold medalists for France
Paralympic silver medalists for France
Paralympic bronze medalists for France
Paralympic medalists in table tennis
Table tennis players at the 1996 Summer Paralympics
Table tennis players at the 2000 Summer Paralympics
Table tennis players at the 2004 Summer Paralympics
Table tennis players at the 2008 Summer Paralympics
Table tennis players at the 2012 Summer Paralympics
Medalists at the 1996 Summer Paralympics
Medalists at the 2000 Summer Paralympics
Medalists at the 2008 Summer Paralympics
Medalists at the 2012 Summer Paralympics
Sportspeople from Colmar
21st-century French people
20th-century French people